Kevin Deleon Williams (February 17, 1970 – December 18, 2012) was an American football running back in the National Football League.

Career
Williams was drafted in the fifth round of the 1993 NFL Draft by the Denver Broncos, but did not make the team. He would spend the 1993 NFL season with the Green Bay Packers.

He played at the collegiate level at the University of California, Los Angeles.

See also
List of Green Bay Packers players

References

1970 births
2012 deaths
American football running backs
Frankfurt Galaxy players
Green Bay Packers players
People from Marshall, Texas
UCLA Bruins football players
Denver Broncos players